Adolf Josef Storfer (11 January 1888, Botoşani, Romania – 2 December 1944, Melbourne, Australia) was an educated Austrian lawyer turned journalist and publisher. He belonged to Sigmund Freud's group of friends in Vienna and fled to Australia via Shanghai at the last minute in 1938.

References 
 Yuan Zhiying: A. J. Storfer und die „Gelbe Post“. In: Literaturstraße. Chinesisch-deutsches Jahrbuch für Sprache, Literatur und Kultur 9 (2008), pp. 225–238.	
 Christian Pape: Verdrängt, Verkannt, Vergessen? Ein Beitrag zu Leben und Werken von Adolf Josef Storfer. In: Chilufim. Zeitschrift für jüdische Kulturgeschichte 12 (2012), pp. 5–26.

External links 
 Yellow Post: An East Asian Semi-monthly, a digitized periodical published by Storfer while he was living in exile, at the Leo Baeck Institute, New York

1888 births
1944 deaths
People from Botoșani
Romanian Jews
Jewish emigrants from Austria to Australia after the Anschluss
Analysands of Sigmund Freud